Bala Söyüdlü (also, Bala Sëyudlyu) is a village in the Shaki Rayon of Azerbaijan.

References 

Populated places in Shaki District